108 may refer to:
 108 (number)
 AD 108, a year
 108 BC, a year
 108 (artist) (born 1978), Italian street artist
 108 (band), an American hardcore band
 108 (emergency telephone number), an emergency telephone number in several states in India
 108 (Lost)
 108 (MBTA bus), a bus route in Boston, Massachusetts, US
 108 (New Jersey bus), a bus route in Newark, New Jersey, US
 Peugeot 108, a city car.
 108 Heroes, the famous set of outlaws from Water Margin

See also
 10/8 (disambiguation)
Hassium, a chemical element with atomic number 108